Gökçeviran may refer to:

 Gökçeören, Kalecik, Ankara Province, Turkey
 Gökçeören, Osmangazi, Bursa Province, Turkey
 Gökçeören, İzmit, Kocaeli Province, Turkey